Kaithi is a Unicode block containing characters historically used for writing Bhojpuri, Bajjika, Magahi, Awadhi, Maithili, Urdu, Hindi, and other related languages of the Bihar/Uttar Pradesh area of northern India.

History
The following Unicode-related documents record the purpose and process of defining specific characters in the Kaithi block:

References 

Unicode blocks